Indonesia's Got Talent is an Indonesian talent variety show on RCTI (Indosiar in 2010 and SCTV in 2014) that began July 23, 2010.  It is based on the Got Talent franchise, a British TV format conceived and owned by Simon Cowell's SYCO company. Indonesia Mencari Bakat, broadcast on Trans TV, was copied from the original Got Talent format. However, Indonesia Mencari Bakat was more successful than the original format in terms of TV ratings, especially in first and third season.

Viewers are able to join through text and online registration via Internet. Auditions are held in key cities such as Surabaya, Medan, Bandung, Jakarta, Palembang, Jogjakarta, Makassar, Padang, Bali, and Banjarmasin.

Judges and Presenters

Season 1
Indonesia's Got Talent on the first appearance was hosted by Tora Sudiro and Vincent Rompies. The judges panel was made up of an Indonesian diva Vina Panduwinata, actor Anjasmara, and senior actress Ria Irawan.

The first appearance of Indonesia's Got Talent aired July 23, 2010. This season delayed for two years. This season would supposed to be premiered on 2008.

The first appearance of Indonesia's Got Talent had the winner Vania Larissa, and for the winner, Rp. 100.000.000,- will be granted for her.

Season 2
In December 2013 FremantleMedia and SCTV announced that season 2 would launch in 2014 with a new host broadcaster on SCTV, new hosts and a stellar line up of judges.  Anggun, Ari Lasso, Indy Barends and Jay Subiyakto were the new judging panel and with Evan Sanders and Ibnu Jamil as hosts.

The new look series was based on Britain's Got Talent with X Factor Indonesia and Indonesian Idol Executive Producer, Glenn Sims as show runner and Sacha Watimena (from Pilipinas Got Talent) as Executive Producer. The prize for season two was the biggest ever offered on an Indonesian TV series with an IDR 500,000,000 (approximately $41,000) cash prize for the winner together with a management contract with Sony Entertainment and Syco.

The second season of Indonesia's Got Talent had the winner Putri Ariani, and for the winner, Rp. 500.000.000,- will be granted for her.

Season 3
In February 2022 Fremantle and RCTI announced that season 3 would launch in 2022 with a new host broadcaster on RCTI and will be hosted by Robby Purba, who was also the host of Syco's adoption singing talent show, X Factor Indonesia. The judges panel was made up of an Indonesian diva Rossa, fashion designer and television host Ivan Gunawan, actor, TV Host, and ex-basketball player, Denny Sumargo and Indonesian content creator and YouTuber, Reza Oktovian.

Pasheman 90 are the winner of Indonesia's Got Talent for this appearance. It marking the first winning of variety talent on this appearance, after the two first appearance that won by singers. The Winner will be granted Rp. 150.000.000,- and 1 Hyundai Stargazer vehicle.
Season 4

On January 18, Fremantle and RCTI announce that the season 4 will be launch in 2023. With Robby Purba will be continue his presenting role, and the four judges will be continuing their judging role. The online audition was already open on January 21, and the team starts for a search the talent across the country on February 9.

Overview

First Round (Auditions)

It all starts at the audition process, which took place throughout April and May 2010. The first round was judges by independent judges to choose the best talent and brought them to Jakarta to meet the 3 judges. This phases made 450 best talent going to Jakarta to the next round.

Second Round  (Judges'Choice/Cull/Cuts)

In the first appearance of Indonesia's Got Talent, thousands of thousands acts have been auditioned. Only hundreds of acts would face the judges decision. The second round called the "Judges Choice". In this round, top 56 would settled and battled it up for Indonesia's Votes in the Live Semi - Finals.

In the second apprerance of Indonesia's Got Talent, thousands of thousands acts have been auditioned. Now, it's the judges turn for made 51 acts from 98 acts that passed on auditions, make it to the Live Semi- Finals, 4 Golden Buzzer recipients included. The total of Semifinalists in that season was 55 Semifinalists. This round called the Judges Cull.

In the third apprerance of Indonesia's Got Talent, hundreds of hundreds acts have been auditioned. Now, they must showcase their talent once again in front of the judges and studio audience. It's the hard work of the judges to pick several of them for the Quarter - Finals.

Third Round (quarter-finals)

Quarter Finals was held on September 12, 2022. It was the first time in the Got Talent history franchise, that this round was held without a live show conducted. It was still a conducted taping episodes. 2 episodes were tapped on this round. It was 37 acts that passed the Judge Cuts round, would be performed once again for 18 places in the  Semi Final round. And would be also filled with 4 Golden Buzzer auditionees.

Fourth Round (Live Semi Finals/Top 56/Top 51/Top 22)

In the first two appearances, 56 acts (51 acts in the next appearance) would be battled it out for the spot on the live season finale. In the third appearance, 22 acts, consists of 18 Quarterfinalists of the two Quarter Finals episode, plus 4 Golden Buzzer from the  Auditions, They'll showcase their talents for a spot to the live season finale.

In first two appearances, this round held Live, but in the third appearance, it's a taping and not a  Live.

Fifth Round (Road To Grand Final) 
This round was the first time used in the Got Talent franchises. This round will be featuring the 10 semifinalists, that qualify in the Semi Finals, that will be performing their act. In this round, it will be a Sudden Death round for the 5 place in the Live Season Finale.

Final Round (Live Season Finale)

In the first appearance, 6 Grand Finalists that sucsseded for the Grand Finals, will make it through to the season finale. This is the last stage that must they conquered. It was changed in the second appearance. 5 acts would be progressed from 12 Grand Finalists''. In the third appearance, it will be changing again. 10 become 5, 5 become 3, 3 become 2, until the host revealing the winner.

Seasons

Season 1

The first season began on July 23, 2010. It was held in some major cities in the Indonesia.

Season 2

Season 3

Indonesia's Got Talent season 3 is the talent search which showed by RCTI, premiered at August 8, 2022.

Controversy
Many people think that Indonesia's Got Talent (IGT) imitates Indonesia Mencari Bakat (IMB) which aired by Trans TV. Though, actually IGT has been planned since 2008 but held in the year 2010. IMB on Trans TV is a talent show with a similar format to the Got Talent franchise. IGT is owned by FremantleMedia and has bought the license to broadcast it officially in Indonesia.

External links
Official website

Got Talent
Indonesian reality television series
Television series by Fremantle (company)
2010 Indonesian television series debuts
2010 Indonesian television series endings
2014 Indonesian television series debuts
2014 Indonesian television series endings
2022 Indonesian television series debuts
Indonesian-language television shows
Indonesian television series based on British television series
Indosiar original programming
SCTV (TV network) original programming
RCTI original programming